Vadim Uraneff (6 February 1895 – 5 April 1952) was a Russian actor and librettist who helped John Barrymore and Katharine Hepburn when it was hoped they would appear in The Song of Solomon.

He was also a mime who played Lucianus in Hamlet in the Ballet Russe. As theater critic, he explained in 1923: 
The [vaudeville] actor works with the idea of an immediate response from the audience: and with regard to its demands. By cutting out everything -every line, gesture, movement- to which the audience does not react and by improvising new thins, he establishes unusual unity between the audience and himself... Stylization in gesture, pose, misen-scène and make-up follows as a result of long experiment before the primitive spectator whose power as judge is absolute.

He translated the lyric drama Star (The) Woman from Russian alongside P. Colum.

He directed the theatre drama Anathema by L. N. Andreev at the Apollo Theater, New York.

He is buried at the Hollywood Forever Cemetery.

Filmography 
 I Believed in You (1934) as Xandy vendor
 Friends and Lovers (1931) as Ivanoff
 The Medicine Man (1930) as Gus
 Midnight Madness (1928) as Joe
 Fazil (1928) as Ahmed.
 Once and Forever (1927) as Axel
 Little Mickey Grogan (1927) as Crooked
 The Magic Flame (1927) as the visitor.
 The Flame of the Yukon (1926) as Solo Jim
 Siberia (1926) as Kyrill Vronsky
 The Blonde Saint (1926) as Nino
 The Silent Power (1926) as Jerry Spencer
 The Sea Beast (1926) as Pip

References

External links 
 
 
 

20th-century Russian male actors
1895 births
1952 deaths
Russian male silent film actors
Russian librettists
20th-century Russian translators
Emigrants from the Russian Empire to the United States